Richard Henry Fallon Jr. (born 4 January 1952) is an American legal scholar and Story Professor of Law at Harvard Law School.

Early life and education 
Fallon was born in Augusta, Maine, on 4 January 1952, and attended Yale College, graduating in 1975 with a bachelor of arts degree. He then accepted a Rhodes Scholarship to the University of Oxford, where he completed an interdisciplinary undergraduate degree in philosophy, politics and economics in 1977. Fallon returned to the United States and earned a Juris Doctor degree from Yale Law School in 1980. Fallon subsequently served as a law clerk for J. Skelly Wright and Lewis F. Powell, then began his teaching career at Harvard Law School in 1982, where he was appointed to a full professorship in 1987.

Career 
In 2005, Fallon was named Ralph S. Tyler, Jr. Professor of Constitutional Law, succeeding Laurence Tribe, and later became the Story Professor of Law, a position formerly held by Daniel Meltzer. Fallon is a member of the American Law Institute, as well as the American Academy of Arts and Sciences. Other awards Fallon has received include the 2019 Thomas M. Cooley Book Prize, and the 2021 Daniel J. Meltzer Award from the Association of American Law Schools.

References

1952 births
Living people
American Rhodes Scholars
Yale College alumni
Yale Law School alumni
Alumni of the University of Oxford
American expatriates in the United Kingdom
Harvard Law School alumni
Members of the American Law Institute
21st-century American male writers
20th-century American male writers
People from Augusta, Maine
Writers from Maine
Fellows of the American Academy of Arts and Sciences